A panicle is a much-branched inflorescence. Some authors distinguish it from a compound spike inflorescence, by requiring that the flowers (and fruit) be pedicellate (having a single stem per flower). The branches of a panicle are often racemes. A panicle may have determinate or indeterminate growth.

This type of inflorescence is largely characteristic of grasses such as oat and crabgrass, as well as other plants such as pistachio and mamoncillo. Botanists use the term paniculate in two ways: "having a true panicle inflorescence" as well as  "having an inflorescence with the form but not necessarily the structure of a panicle".

Corymb
A corymb may have a paniculate branching structure, with the lower flowers having longer pedicels than the upper, thus giving a flattish top superficially resembling an umbel. Many species in the subfamily Amygdaloideae, such as hawthorns and rowans, produce their flowers in corymbs.

See also
 Thyrse, a branched inflorescence where the main axis has indeterminate growth, and the branches have determinate growth

Notes

References

Plant morphology